is a Japanese athlete who competes primarily in the 1500 metres. He competed at 2005 and 2007 World Championships reaching the semifinals stage the second time. He holds national records at several distances.

Competition record

Personal bests
Outdoor
800 metres – 1:50.35 (Tajimi 2010)
1000 metres – 2:19.65 (Abashiri 2005) NR
1500 metres – 3:37.42 (Heusden-Zolder 2004) NR
One mile – 3:59.06 (Amagasaki 2002)
2000 metres – 5:07.24 (Kortrijk 2006) NR
5000 metres – 13:53.90 (Kanazawa 2001)
10,000 metres – 28:47.66 (Yokohama 2001)
Half marathon – 1:04:53 (Inuyama 2001)
Indoor
1500 metres – 3:49.77 (Doha 2008)
One mile – 4:04.76 (Boston 2005) NR

References

1978 births
Living people
Japanese male middle-distance runners
Asian Games competitors for Japan
Athletes (track and field) at the 2002 Asian Games
Athletes (track and field) at the 2006 Asian Games
World Athletics Championships athletes for Japan
Japan Championships in Athletics winners
21st-century Japanese people